The former Kowloon Magistracy is a historic building and former Magistrate's and District Court in Hong Kong, located at No. 38 Gascoigne Road, Yau Ma Tei, Kowloon.

History
Constructed under the direction of Director of Public Works Richard McNeil Henderson in 1933, the building housed a court handling minor criminal cases at magistrate's level. During the Japanese occupation of Hong Kong, it served as the Kowloon headquarters of the Kempeitai. It later served as the Kowloon District Court which was renamed in 1957 the South Kowloon District Court. After the opening of the North Kowloon Magistracy in 1960, some cases were diverted there. The South Kowloon District Court remained in use as a district court until 1986 when it became the Judiciary Central File Repository. It has served as the Lands Tribunal since 1997 and accommodates five courts.

The South Kowloon Magistracy moved to a building next door (36 Gascoigne Road) where it operated until final closure in 2000.

Conservation
The former Kowloon Magistracy was listed as a Grade II historic building in 1992 and upgraded to Grade I in 2009.

References

Judiciary of Hong Kong
Yau Ma Tei
Grade I historic buildings in Hong Kong
Government buildings completed in 1936